Adam Dread (born February 1, 1963, in Pittsburgh, Pennsylvania) was a city council member-at-large for the Metropolitan Council of Nashville and Davidson County until September 2007. He is currently a practicing attorney and businessman in Nashville.

Education and career 
Adam Dread was elected to the Metro Council in December 2002 Since then, he set a Metro record for winning the most county wide races in the shortest period of time (he won four races in one year, including run-offs.) He was endorsed by every major newspaper, union, and trade organization. Prior to that, he had run for a Metro Council at-large seat in 1999. He chaired the Public Safety - Beer and Regulated Beverages Committee and also served as a member of the Public Works Committee and the Traffic and Parking Committee. He was at one point Chair of the Convention and Tourism Committee. He is also known for building the live music stage at the airport, in conjunction with the Convention Tourism Bureau, to welcome visitors and locals to Music City with live music. Popular with the public, in 2008 he was voted "The Best Metro Councilman Out the Door", as he was term limited, and could not run again.

Education
Adam Dread graduated from Palm Beach Academy and Vanderbilt University with a Bachelor of Arts degree. He obtained his J.D. when he graduated from Nashville School of Law in 2004.

Law
Adam Dread works as an attorney at Durham & Dread, PLC.  They are well known for being one of the first Tennessee firms to go after the makers of tainted pet food from China. Since 1999, he has worked as a freelance consultant and corporate spokesman for numerous clients including Jack Daniels and Fruit of the Loom. From 1999 until elected for Metro Council, he was on the Metro Beer Permit Board.  In 2007 and 2008 the Readers of The Nashville Scene voted Dread one of the Top 3 DUI Attorneys in Nashville, and "Best Attorney" for five years.

Journalism and Radio
Dread was a freelance columnist between 1996 and 2000. Between 1996 and 1999, he was the feature producer of TNN's Prime Time Country.
Between 1992 and 1995, he was the radio host of the award-winning "Man of Leisure Mornings" on Thunder 94 and Lightning 100 Morning.
Between 1986 and 1992, he worked as a professional touring stand-up comedian in the US and abroad.

Author and Songwriter
He is also a published songwriter and book author. His four books, You've Obviously Spent Time on Nantucket If... and ACK't 2 and "ACK't 3" "ACK't 4" are still popular on the resort island. He has also launched ManFromNantucket.oom, that designs and markets island based men's accessories. One of his parody songs, "Titans #1", was performed at the 2000 Super Bowl festivities. Another parody, "Did I Shave My Back for This?" was the title track of a popular Cledus T. Judd country comedy album.

Volunteerism
Prior to his terms on the Metro Council he served on the Boards of the Cystic Fibrosis Foundation, The Community Resource Center (CRC), and The Belcourt Theatre. He still hosts the annual "Oyster Easter" event for the CRC and was named their "2007 Volunteer of the Year." As an attorney, Adam Dread performs much pro bono or reduced-fee work. For his efforts, he has been voted "Best Attorney" in Nashville by the readers of the Nashville Scene a record five times, more than any other attorney in Nashville.

2009
In the summer of 2009 Dread became very involved in the controversial new gun laws enacted in Tennessee. When the Legislature passed a law allowing people with carry permits to take their handguns into bars, Dread, and a team of lawyers, sued the State of Tennessee. They alleged that the law was passed due to fraudulent facts provided by lobbyists. In addition to the public safety and economic arguments, the team argued that the law was unconstitutional on its face, and created an unsafe work environment, thus violating OSHA standards.
Dread debated this issue multiple times on Fox & Friends. The case is still pending in Chancery Court. In September 2009, Dread joined Brady Campaign President, Paul Helmke, in a debate with National Rifle Association (NRA) lobbyists at the University of Tennessee at Martin campus.

References 

1963 births
Metropolitan Council members (Nashville, Tennessee)
Living people
Politicians from Pittsburgh